Mano Po Legacy: The Family Fortune is a 2022 Philippine television drama series broadcast by GMA Network. The series is the first installment of Mano Po Legacy. Directed by Ian Loreños, it stars Barbie Forteza, Sunshine Cruz and Maricel Laxa. It premiered on January 3, 2022 on the network's Telebabad line up. The series concluded on February 25, 2022 with a total of 40 episodes. It was replaced by Widows' Web in its timeslot.

Cast and characters
Lead cast
 Barbie Forteza as Steffanie "Steffy" Dy
 Sunshine Cruz as Cristine Yang Chan
 Maricel Laxa as Valerie Lim / Rosemarie Lim

Supporting cast
 Boots Anson-Roa as Consuelo Yang-Chan
 David Licauco as Anton Sy Chan
 Rob Gomez as Joseph Garces Chan
 Nikki Co as Jameson Lim Chan
 Dustin Yu as Kenneth Sy Chan
 Darwin Yu as Leo Uy-Evangelista
 Casie Banks as Jade Lee

Recurring cast
 Almira Muhlach as Elizabeth Sy-Chan
 David Chua as Philip Lo
 Victor Basa as Allan Rivera
 Lovely Rivero as Mila Rose de Guia
 Marnie Lapuz as Fides Mercado
 Earl Ignacio as Johnny Dy
 Marissa Sanchez as Merlita Dy
 Kate Yalung as Myla Capistrano
 Ann Colis as Margarita "Maggie" Cruz-Rivera
 Arkin del Rosario as Carl Yap
 Jay Glorioso as Lirio Lim
 Mel Caluag as Romina "Mina" Lim
 Sue Prado as Elena "Ellen" Garces
 Arnold Reyes as Martin Valderrama
 Robert Seña as Edison Y. Chan
 Derick Lauchengco as Peter Ang
 VJ Mendoza as Kerwin Torres
 Anikka Camaya as Pamela dela Cruz
 Francis Mata as Ronaldo Sy
 Ken Chan as Richard Lim
 Bianca Umali as Irene Pacheco
 Ray An Dulay as Police Officer Salcedo

Episodes

Ratings
According to AGB Nielsen Philippines' Nationwide Urban Television Audience Measurement People in television homes, the pilot episode of Mano Po Legacy: The Family Fortune earned a 6.9% rating.

References

External links
 

2022 Philippine television series debuts
2022 Philippine television series endings
Filipino-language television shows
GMA Network drama series
Television shows set in the Philippines